Beginning with the onset of the Tigray War in November 2020, acute food shortages leading to death and starvation became widespread in northern Ethiopia, and the Tigray, Afar and Amhara Regions in particular. , there are 13 million people faced acute food insecurity, and an estimated 150,000–200,000 had died of starvation by March 2022. In the Tigray Region alone, 89% of people are in need of food aid, with those facing severe hunger reaching up to 47%. In a report published in June 2021, over 350,000 people were already experiencing catastrophic famine conditions (IPC Phase 5). It is the worst famine to happen in East Africa since 2011–2012.

The main reasons for the famine are the Tigray War, which caused mass displacement and loss of harvests, in addition to then-ongoing locust infestations in the region. As reported by The Economist, the federal Ethiopian government was "deliberately holding back food in an effort to starve" the Tigray People's Liberation Front (TPLF); a claim disputed by the  Ethiopian government in late January. On 10 February 2021, Abera Tola, head of Ethiopian Red Cross Society (ERCS), described displaced people "reach[ing] camps in Tigrayan towns [being] 'emaciated'" and that "their skin [was] really on their bones." He estimated that "eighty percent" of Tigray was unreachable by humanitarian assistance. In early February 2021, Muferiat Kamil, Ethiopian Minister of Peace, agreed with World Food Programme representatives to allow increased food distribution in Tigray Region. While the situation improved after the March 2022 truce and allowed for humanitarian distribution of food, the lack of rain in the spring of 2022 compounded the already existing food insecurity. The resurgence of fighting after the ceasefire collapsed in August 2022 exacerbated the  situation even more; by October, between 400–900 a day were dying of starvation.

Definitions 
On 7 February 2021, Tufts University researcher Alex de Waal argued that the information blackout from the Tigray Region should not be used to "quibble" over the formal classification of the type of starvation in terms of the Integrated Food Security Phase Classification (IPC) of acute food security, in which the severest classifications are "crisis (phase 3)", "emergency (phase 4)" and "famine (phase 5)". De Waal said that 380,000 people had died of "hunger and violence" during the South Sudanese Civil War, among which only 1% had died in areas classified as being under "famine (phase 5)".

Death counts

Transitional government of Tigray 
Abraha Desta, head of the opposition polical party Arena Tigray and head of the Bureau of Social Affairs of the Transitional Government of Tigray, stated on 25 January 2021 that reports had been received of 10 people who had died from starvation in Gulomahda woreda, which in the 2007 census had 84,236 inhabitants; and 3 starvation deaths in Adwa, which had 40,500 residents in the 2007 census. The mortality rate for a phase 5 famine is 2 deaths per 10,000 inhabitants per day.

In June 2021, a Tigray regional health official stated that the district administrator of Mai Kinetal in Indafelasi, Berhe Desta Gebremariam, had reported 125 deaths by starvation, describing people as "falling like leaves", as well 315 other deaths, 558 people who had been victims of sexual violence, and the looting of 5000 homes.

United Nations OCHA 
On 15 April 2021, Mark Lowcock of OCHA said that four internally displaced people in Tigray Region were known to have died of hunger that week, and 150 people had died of hunger in Ofla.

On 16 June 2022, the specialised digital service of OCHA, ReliefWeb, released a statement on the famine situation affecting the entirety of the Horn of Africa, including Ethiopia. The statement announced that 'one person is likely dying from hunger every 48 seconds in the region.

Claims of intent 

On 22 January 2021, The Economist claimed that it was "likely that the authorities [were] deliberately holding back food in an effort to starve the rebels out."

In early April 2021, the World Peace Foundation published a report in which it listed Article 8(2)(b)(xxv) of the Rome Statute of the International Criminal Court, "Intentionally using starvation of civilians as a method of warfare by depriving them of objects indispensable to their survival, including wilfully impeding relief supplies as provided for under the Geneva Conventions" and Articles 270(i) and 273 of the 2004 Ethiopian Penal Code as appropriate criminal laws in relation to starvation in the Tigray War. Section 4 of the report listed evidence. The authors concluded that the Ethiopian and Eritrean governments were responsible for starvation, and that "circumstantial evidence suggest[ed] that [the starvation was] intentional, systematic and widespread."

In early October 2021, Mark Lowcock, who led OCHA during part of the Tigray War, stated that the Ethiopian federal government was deliberately starving Tigray, "running a sophisticated campaign to stop aid getting in" and that there was "not just an attempt to starve six million people but an attempt to cover up what's going on."

In November 2021 in Human Geography, Teklehaymanot G. Weldemichel argued that "famine [in Tigray Region] was from the start an end goal of the Ethiopian and Eritrean" governments. Teklehaymanot listed key tactics that he saw as inducing a famine to include the systematic looting and destruction of infrastructure; banking measures that blocked access to cash; and a siege obstructing humanitarian aid.

Causal factors and estimates 

In an 8 January meeting of the Tigray Emergency Coordination Center between international aid groups and Transitional Government of Tigray officials in Mekelle, capital of Tigray Region, a regional administraor, Berhane Gebretsadik, estimated that "hundreds of thousands" were at risk of starvation if food aid wasn't increased, and that in Adwa, people were "dying while they [were] sleeping".

A federal official stated that there was "no starvation in Ethiopia" on 19 January 2021, according to The Economist.

On 22 January 2021, The Economist described estimates by Famine Early Warning Systems Network (FEWS NET)  as Tigray being "probably one step from famine" and quoted a "Western diplomat" estimating, "We could have a million dead there in a couple of months". The burning of crops and abandonment of fields prior to harvest time were listed by The Economist as causative factors of starvation.

On 25 January 2021, Abraha stated that many people were displaced after having their property looted and that food was available, but there was a distribution problem, since drivers were afraid. He stated that foreign aid organisations were unable to leave the capital Mekelle due to security concerns for convoys. He described the situation as "'unprecedented in its history', and that 4.5 million people were in need of emergency food assistance". The Economist described the access blocks as including the initial federal government authorisation, authorisations from neighbouring regional governments, and blocks by local armed forces "citing security" or worried about food being provided to the Tigray People's Liberation Front (TPLF).

In early February 2021, the FEWS NET classified the level of starvation in Tigray Region under the Integrated Food Security Phase Classification (IPC) criteria as "Emergency (Phase 4)" in the central areas and as "Crisis (Phase 3)" in the rest of Tigray Region apart from Western Tigray. FEWS NET saw the armed conflict and access constraints, low levels of economic activity and income-earning, and "significant disruption to market activity" as being key factors for phase 4 level acute food security to continue in central and eastern Tigray through to May 2021.

According to Human Rights Concern Eritrea (HRCE), prior to the Eritrean refugees in the Shimelba and Hitsats refugee camps being forced to return to Eritrea, they were so hungry that they were "forced to eat grass and roots".

On 10 February 2021, Abera Tola, head of Ethiopian Red Cross Society (ERCS), stated,  Abera stated that "eighty percent" of Tigray was unreachable from humanitarian assistance. He predicted that the number of deaths by starvation could mount to "tens of thousands" within two months.

On 2 July 2021, the United Nations Security Council discussed the issue and told that more than 400,000 people were being affected by food insecurity and that 33,000 children were severely malnourished. The report also stated that 1.8 million people were on the brink of famine.

On 16 November 2021, Dr Hagos Godefay, the former head of the health bureau in the pre-conflict Tigrayan government, announced that research had confirmed that at least 186 children under the age of 5 had died in Tigray due to starvation between late June and October 2021.

An investigation revealed in November 2021 that the UAE opened an air bridge to provide extensive military support to the Ethiopian government, which has killed tens of thousands of civilians and displaced millions. More than 90 flights were operated between Sweihan Base, Abu Dhabi, and Harar Meda Base, south of Ethiopia’s capital Addis Ababa, between September and October 2021. The UAE took support of two private shipping companies, including one Spanish and one Ethiopian firm, to carry out this extensive operation. The satellite images also showed a Chinese-made Wing Loong drone at the Ethiopian airport.

On 27 November 2021, The Economist reported that Turkey, Iran, Israel and the UAE have all been selling weapons to Ethiopia, while the relations soured between the US and Ethiopia. Eritrea reportedly dispatched troops on behalf of Abiy Ahmed, and the UAE was accused of flying drones. The Emirates also pledged billions in aid, going against America that suggested restraint. The help from such autocratic powers escalated the war in Tigray, causing humanitarian crisis for tens of millions of Ethiopians.

Food aid distribution 

Muferiat Kamil, Ethiopian Minister of Peace, agreed with World Food Programme representatives to "scale up" food distribution in Tigray Region, authorising 25 international staff for access, while another 49 awaited approval. On 12 February, a total of 53 international staff of United Nations agencies and NGOs had received approval to enter Tigray Region.

Ukraine regularly sent food aid to Ethiopia throughout the conflict, even after being invaded by Russia in 2022, including a 50,000 tonne shipment of grain to the Horn of Africa region, wherein Ukraine (with support from Germany and France) reimbursed money to Ethiopia and Somalia for the cost of shipping. As recently as 17 November 2022, Ukraine was sending 27,000 tonnes of wheat to Ethiopia.

Blockade of aid deliveries 
On 1 February 2021, Jan Egeland, head of the Norwegian Refugee Council, stated that "twelve weeks since the start of conflict in [Tigray Region], meaningful humanitarian operations [had] still not begun", with aid organisations unable to access much of the region, especially away from Mekelle and major roads, and with administrative delays and unpredictability in obtaining authorisations for access. Egeland stated that he had "rarely seen a humanitarian response so impeded and unable to deliver in response for so long, to so many with such pressing needs." By 15 April 2021, humanitarian aid distribution continued to be blocked on several of the main roads by the Eritrean Defence Forces, and by Amhara Region security forces.

On 30 September 2021, following a UN statement about the federal Ethiopian blockade against deliveries of food aid to Tigray, the federal government expelled seven senior United Nations (UN) officials. The federal Ethiopian authorities accused the UN officials of "meddling" in Ethiopian "internal affairs". The officials were given 72 hours to leave Ethiopia. On 4 November 2021, researcher Alex de Waal called for UN organisations to negotiate the shipping of food aid into Tigray Region directly with the Tigrayan government, the Oromo Liberation Army "and whoever controls territory and people", overriding the political control of the federal Ethiopian authorities if necessary.

Disruption from other conflicts 

The 2022 Russian invasion of Ukraine exacerbated the already existing food crisis, as Ethiopia imports a significant amount of grain from Ukraine. On 30 October 2022, for instance, as part of Black Sea Grain Initiative, a shipment of 40,000 tonnes in grain was originally scheduled to leave a Ukrainian port bound for Ethiopia. However, Russia suspended it's participation from the deal the day prior, citing a then-recent drone attack in Crimea, which threatened to keep the ship stuck at port in Odesa. Russia had previously launched missile strikes on Odesa on 2 May and 23 July the same year, damaging infrastructure needed for either the production or shipment of grain.

See also 

 2022 food crises
 2021 Somali drought

References 

Famines in Ethiopia
21st-century famines
Tigray War